Aplasia (from Greek a, "not", "no" + plasis, "formation") is a birth defect where an organ or tissue is wholly or largely absent. It is caused by a defect in a developmental process.

Aplastic anemia is the failure of the body to produce blood cells. It may occur at any time, and has multiple causes.


Examples
 Acquired pure red cell aplasia
 Aplasia cutis congenita
 Aplastic anemia
 Germ cell aplasia, also known as Sertoli cell-only syndrome
 Radial aplasia
 Thymic aplasia, which is found in DiGeorge syndrome and also occurs naturally as part of the gradual loss of function of the immune system later in life

See also 
 Atrophy
 Hyperplasia
 Hypoplasia
 Neoplasia
 List of biological development disorders

References

Medical terminology
Anatomy
Embryology
Blood disorders